Aleksandar Maksimović (born 26 February 1988) is a Serbian Greco-Roman wrestler who has competed in the 66 and 71 kg weight divisions.

Maksimović has won three bronze medals at the European Wrestling Championships in 2011, 2012, and 2017. At the 2016 European Wrestling Championship, he took a silver medal after a loss by a one-point difference against Armenia.

At the 2009 Mediterranean Games in Pescara, Maksimović won a silver medal. He also won a silver medal at the 2013 Mediterranean Games in Mersin.

Maksimović represented Serbia at the 2012 Summer Olympics.

References

External links
 
 
 
 

1988 births
Living people
Olympic wrestlers of Serbia
Wrestlers at the 2012 Summer Olympics
Sportspeople from Belgrade
European Games competitors for Serbia
Wrestlers at the 2015 European Games
Serbian male sport wrestlers
Mediterranean Games silver medalists for Serbia
Competitors at the 2009 Mediterranean Games
Competitors at the 2013 Mediterranean Games
Mediterranean Games medalists in wrestling
Wrestlers at the 2019 European Games
20th-century Serbian people
21st-century Serbian people